Taking Over was an EP released by The King Blues in 2007. It was available initially on their December 2007 tour of the UK. The title is taken from the track "Taking Over" from their first album Under The Fog, however the version that appears on the EP differs from the album version. The other three tracks on the EP were previously unreleased, although a different recording of "If Genghis Khan..." was released as the B-side to the first single, "Mr. Music Man".

Track listing

"If Genghis Khan Then Why Can't I?"  - 2:43
"Sharp Like a Razor"  - 3:53
"Taking Over" - 2:46
"Keep Me Down" - 3:56

References

The King Blues albums
2007 EPs